Abu Mohammed Hammuda ibn Ali Pasha (9 December 1759 – 15 September 1814) was the fifth leader of the Husainid dynasty and the ruler of Tunisia from 26 May 1782 until his death on 15 September 1814.

See also
Moustapha Khodja
Venetian bombardments of the Beylik of Tunis (1784–88)
Youssef Saheb Ettabaa

References

18th-century people from the Ottoman Empire
19th-century people from the Ottoman Empire
18th-century Tunisian people
19th-century Tunisian people
1759 births
1814 deaths
Beys of Tunis
18th-century rulers in Africa
19th-century rulers in Africa
Tunisian royalty